The Edel Excel is a South Korean single-place, paraglider that was designed and produced by Edel Paragliders of Gwangju. It is now out of production.

Design and development
The Excel was designed as an advanced and competition glider. It can be fitted with thin cross-section lines to reduce drag for competition flying.

The models are each named for their relative size.

Variants
Excel S
Small-sized model for mlight-weight pilots. The glider model is DHV 2-3 and AFNOR Competition certified.
Excel L
Large-sized model for heavier pilots. The glider model is DHV 2-3 and AFNOR Competition certified.

Specifications (Excel L)

References

Excel
Paragliders